The Eastern Ultralights Snoop is a family of American ultralight aircraft that was designed by Bob Able and produced by Eastern Ultralights, starting in 1981. The aircraft was supplied as a kit for amateur construction.

Design and development
The Snoop is characterized as a "Ripsilver" or unauthorized Eipper Quicksilver derivative. It features a cable-braced high wing, a single-seat open cockpit, tricycle landing gear and a single engine in pusher configuration.

The aircraft is made from bolted-together aluminum tubing, with the flying surfaces covered in Dacron sailcloth. Its wing is cable-braced from an inverted "V" kingpost. The pilot is accommodated on an open seat and is provided with conventional three-axis flight controls. The landing gear includes suspension on all three wheels, but no nosewheel steering. The Cuyuna UL II engine is mounted on the wing leading edge and drives the pusher propeller which is located aft of the wing's trailing edge though an extension shaft. This arrangement allows the aircraft to remain sitting on its nosewheel while unoccupied, unlike most ultralight pusher aircraft.

Variants
Snoop I
Single-seat model with spoilers used for roll control, a  span wing and no flaps.
Snoop +
Single-seat model with ailerons used for roll control, a shorter wing and flaps.
Snoop II
Two-seat trainer model.

Specifications (Snoop I)

References

External links
Photo of a Snoop I
Photo of a Snoop I

1980s United States ultralight aircraft
Homebuilt aircraft
Single-engined pusher aircraft